Manikavagasam Harichandra (21 July 1930 – 29 June 2022) was a Malaysian middle-distance runner. He competed in the men's 800 metres at the 1956 Summer Olympics.

References

External links
 

1930 births
2022 deaths
Athletes (track and field) at the 1956 Summer Olympics
Malaysian male middle-distance runners
Olympic athletes of Malaya